Raja Ki Aayegi Baraat is a 1996 Indian Hindi-language drama film written and directed by Ashok Gaikwad.

The film marked the Hindi film debut of actress Rani Mukerji. Starting in 1995, principal photography took place in Gangtok and was coordinated with the filming of Biyer Phool, another home production of Ram Mukherjee, Rani's father, which Rani was simultaneously shooting in the area. The film was remade into Tamil as Prathi Gnayiru 9 Manimudhal 10.30 Varai (2006).

Plot 

Mala, a young school teacher, has idealistic dreams for her future. She hopes for a grand love affair, with a large, extravagant wedding and a dashing bridegroom who will arrive on a horse. One day, Mala's friend confides in her about her relationship with the son of a wealthy man, with whom she has been intimate, but is now marrying someone else. Mala accompanies her friend to the man's wedding, successfully managing to disrupt it and reveal the truth. The groom's friend, Raj, is enraged and insults Mala, in response to which she slaps him. Looking for revenge, Raj seeks Mala out and, in the presence of her pupils, beats and rapes her. Mala is distraught and ashamed, getting home to her shocked family with the help of her pupils. The police get involved and Raj is arrested.
 
Raj's powerful father, Rai Bahadur, attempts to cover up the situation by bribing Mala's guardian Karthar Singh, who refuses to accept the money. Raj's sister and brother-in-law support Mala and defend her in the case. The judge finds Raj guilty and orders that he marry Mala in the next twenty-four hours, because her honor has been ruined and no other man would be likely willing to marry her, in her eyes. Raj unsuccessfully tries to kill Mala, and so they get married without great pomp and ceremony. After the marriage, Mala moves into Raj's home, and his family begins to treat her badly. Rai Bahadur travels abroad and instructs his family to deal with Mala and ensure that she is belittled and tortured, with the hope that she is eventually driven out of their house. Raj's elder sister-in-law Sharda is especially tough on Mala since plots for her own sister to be married to Raj, due to his wealth. 
 
Sharda and her siblings lie to Raj about Mala, telling him that she asked them to leave the house. Raj angrily tries to beat Mala but is stopped by Kartar Singh. Raj's uncle makes plans for the couples honeymoon and promises to protect Mala, however it is revealed that he is also trying to kill her.
 
Raj's uncle leaves a snake in the house while Mala is having a shower. When she gets dressed, she sees the snake and faints out of fear. The men believe that she has been bitten. While he is checking on Mala, the snake bites Raj's leg. Mala awakens and saves him, however she is poisoned in the process. Raj is shocked at Mala's actions and realizes that his treatment of her was wrong. His uncle tells Raj that he should leave Mala to die, however he calls a doctor and she recovers. His attitude towards her softens and he stands up to his uncle, who tries to influence him against Mala. The couple gradually fall in love.

Seeking revenge, Raj's uncle and Sharda plot to kill Mala via a gas explosion in the house. Raj's sister and brother-in-law unexpectedly arrive, and his sister goes into the kitchen to light the stove, which results in her death. Rai Bahadur's arrives back in India for his daughter's funeral, where Raj and he argue about Mala. When Raj decides to leave, an altercation arises and Mala is badly wounded. Raj takes her to the hospital and she is in critical condition. The family realises their terrible treatment of Mala, telling Rai Bahadur that they do not want to have anything to do with him. Rai Bahadur mends his ways and comes to apologise. When the police arrive to investigate the matter, Raj tries to spare his father and implicate himself, but Rai Bahadur accepts the fault. Mala regains consciousness and she saves her father-in-law by lying about the incident. After seeing Mala's kind character, she is accepted by Raj's family the couple are remarried in a grand ceremony similar to Mala's dreams.

Cast 
Rani Mukerji as Mala
Shadaab Khan as Raj Bahadur Diwanchand
Javed Khan as  Pratap, Mala's lawyer.		
Gulshan Grover as Gyani Kartar Singh, Mala's foster father.
Divya Dutta as Sharda's sister	
Shashi Sharma as Sharda, Rai Bahadur's elder daughter-in-law.
Gajendra Chauhan as Pratap, Prosecutting attorney.
Sulabha Deshpande as Kaushalya, Maid servant.
Yunus Parvez as Judge 
Mohnish Behl as Ramesh
Saeed Jaffrey as Rai Bahadur Diwanchand
Arjun as Police Inspector Khan
Asrani as Sharda's brother
Dinesh Hingoo as Mechanic Kartar's autoservice
Raza Murad as Raj's Uncle "Mama"
Goga Kapoor as Yanand Prakash
Javed Khan Amrohi as Mechanic Kartar's autoservice
Ghanshyam Rohera as Mechanic Kartar's autoservice
Kunika Sadanand as Sharda Devi
Jennifer Winget as School kid

Music
"Aankhein Ladi Tumse" - Kumar Sanu, Asha Bhosle
"Chanda Ki Chori Karke Chakori" - Aditya Narayan, Kavita Krishnamurthy, Sababat Akhtar
"I Love You" - Vinod Rathore, Poornima
"Kya Roop Hai Tera Kya Rang Hai Tera" - Udit Narayan, Poornima
'Love Bird Kehte Hai Mujhko" - Vijay Benedict
"Palkon Mein Sapne Chamke Ahista" - Poornima
"Rab Ka Hoon Banda" - Mangal Singh
"Raja Ki Aayi Hai Baraat" - Vijayta Pandit

References

External links 

1990s Hindi-language films
1996 films
Films scored by Aadesh Shrivastava
Films shot in Sikkim
Films directed by Ashok Gaikwad
Hindi films remade in other languages